Dikgang Mabalane (born 28 December 1979 in Soweto) is a South African association football right-winger who last played for Moroka Swallows.

He is nicknamed "Terminator" in South Africa due to his pace.

References

External links

1979 births
Living people
South African soccer players
South Africa international soccer players
Association football midfielders
Sportspeople from Soweto
Jomo Cosmos F.C. players
SuperSport United F.C. players
Maritzburg United F.C. players
Orlando Pirates F.C. players
Moroka Swallows F.C. players